The 2017–18 Florida Gulf Coast Eagles women's basketball team represents Florida Gulf Coast University (FGCU) in the 2017–18 NCAA Division I women's basketball season. The Eagles, led by sixteenth year head coach Karl Smesko, play their home games at Alico Arena and were members of the Atlantic Sun Conference. They finish the season 31–5, 12–1 in A-Sun play to win the Atlantic Sun regular season champions. They also won the ASUN Tournament and received an automatic bid to the NCAA women's tournament where they upset Missouri in the first round before losing to Stanford in the second round.

Media
All home games and conference road are shown on ESPN3 or A-Sun.TV. Road games are also broadcast on the FGCU Portal.

Roster

Schedule

|-
!colspan=9 style="background:#; color:#FFFFFF;"| Non-conference regular season

|-
!colspan=9 style="background:#; color:#FFFFFF;"| Atlantic Sun regular season

|-
!colspan=9 style="background:#; color:#FFFFFF;"| Atlantic Sun Women's Tournament

|-
!colspan=9 style="background:#; color:#FFFFFF;"| NCAA Women's Tournament

Rankings
2017–18 NCAA Division I women's basketball rankings

See also
 2017–18 Florida Gulf Coast Eagles men's basketball team

References

Florida Gulf Coast
Florida Gulf Coast Eagles women's basketball seasons
Florida Gulf Coast